The Hirth 3002 is a German aircraft engine, that was designed and produced by Hirth of Benningen for use in ultralight aircraft.

By March 2018, the engine was no longer advertised on the company website and seems to be out of production.

Design and development
The Hirth 3002 is a four-cylinder, two-stroke, horizontally-opposed,  displacement, fan-forced air-cooled, gasoline engine design, with a mechanical gearbox reduction drive with reduction ratios from 2.03 to 3.79:1. It employs dual capacitor discharge ignition and produces  at 6000 rpm.

Specifications (Hirth 3002 E)

See also

References

Hirth aircraft engines
Two-stroke aircraft piston engines
Air-cooled aircraft piston engines
2000s aircraft piston engines